The Winners was a Canadian biographical television miniseries which aired on CBC Television in 1982.

Premise
This series, sponsored by Shell Canada, presented docudramas of Canadian heroes.

Scheduling
The half-hour episodes were originally broadcast on Sundays at 5:30 p.m. from 17 January to 28 March 1982. It was rebroadcast later that year on Sunday evenings from 15 July to 2 September.

Episodes
 Athol Murray, founder of Notre Dame College, Saskatchewan, portrayed by Donnelly Rhodes ("The Winners"); Gordon Ruttan (writer), Brian Walker (director)
 Emily Murphy, portrayed by Martha Henry, co-starring Douglas Campbell, William Hutt, Gerard Parkes and Douglas Rain; John Kent Harrison (writer), Martin Lavut (director)
 H.R. MacMillan - Norman Klenman (writer), Lawrence S. Mirkin (director)
 Pauline Johnson, portrayed by Fern Henry - Munroe Scott (writer), Martha Coolidge (director)
 J.A. Bombardier, portrayed by Yvon Ponton, James Brown (writer), Jean Lefleur (director)
 Charlotte Whitton, portrayed by Kate Lynch; Carol Bolt (writer), Graham Parker (director)
 John Wesley Dafoe - Fiona McHugh (writer), Scott Hylands (director)
 Marion Hilliard, portrayed by Chapelle Jaffe, co-starring Peter Dvorsky, Janet-Laine Green, Lois Maxwell and Mary Pirie; Fiona McHugh (writer), Zale Dalen (director)
 Reginald Fessenden, portrayed by Alan Scarfe; George Robertson (writer), Richard Gilbert (director)
 Vilhjalmur Stefansson, portrayed by Michael J. Reynolds co-starring John Friesen and Eric Peterson; George Robertson and Alan Scarfe (writers)

References

External links
 

CBC Television original programming
1982 Canadian television series debuts
1982 Canadian television series endings
1980s Canadian documentary television series